Bouveret railway station is a railway station in the municipality of Port-Valais, in the Swiss canton of Valais. It is an intermediate stop on the Saint-Gingolph–Saint-Maurice line and is served by local trains only.

Services 
The following services stop at Bouveret:

References

External links 
 
 
 

Railway stations in the canton of Valais
Swiss Federal Railways stations